Đorđe Jovičić (born 11 November 2001) is an ethnic Serbian football midfielder from Bosnia and Herzegovina. He holds both nationalities. He recently played for Fortuna Liga club AS Trenčín.

Club career

AS Trenčín
Jovičić had signed with AS Trenčín on a one-year loan with club option for transfer in the summer of 2021. Jovičić explained, that he agreed to a spell in the Fortuna Liga following advice from Hamza Čataković to increase play time he was unable to collect at Braga. Jovičić made his professional Fortuna Liga debut for Trenčín in home defeat at na Sihoti against DAC Dunajská Streda (0–1). He completed the entirety of the match.

References

External links
 AS Trenčín profile 

2001 births
Living people
People from Šabac
Association football midfielders
Bosnia and Herzegovina footballers
Bosnia and Herzegovina expatriate footballers
Bosnia and Herzegovina youth international footballers
Serbs of Bosnia and Herzegovina
S.C. Braga players
AS Trenčín players
FK Dubnica players
Slovak Super Liga players
Expatriate footballers in Portugal
Serbian expatriate sportspeople in Portugal
Expatriate footballers in Slovakia
Serbian expatriate sportspeople in Slovakia